Qaytarma (also written as Haytarma) is a form of Crimean Tatar folk dance and folk music characterised by cyclical motion. It is most commonly performed at weddings and on holidays.

Description 
During Qaytarma, a male dancer holds his arms apart and forms fists, making short, provocative movements with small jumps. His dancing partner, usually a woman, acts without sharp movements. Instead, she performs exact movements of her legs and shoulders, making smooth, rotational hand movements.

In addition to Crimean Tatars, Krymchaks, Crimean Karaites, Urums, and Ukrainian Greeks also dance Qaytarma. According to researcher Serhiy Zaichenko, Qaytarma music is typically in 9/8 or 7/8 time, which is common of Turkic music.

History 
The exact origins of Qaytarma remain uncertain, but two theories are dominant. The first, proposed by Anatolii Bohorod, suggests that it originates from Sufi whirling. Qaytarma was first mentioned in 1793.

In a 1925 archaeological and ethnographic expedition of Crimea, Crimean Tatar researchers Usein Bodaninsky, Osman Aqçoqraqlı, and  recorded 25 different versions of Qaytarma. Refatov further concluded in 1932 that Qaytarma was unique to the Crimean Tatars, without influence from Russian, Turkish, or Iranian culture. In Zaichenko's 1995 study of Greek Ukrainian dances, he recorded further variations of Qaytarma practiced in the south-eastern Pryazovia region.

In popular culture 
The first written piece of Qaytarma music was created by Alexander Spendiaryan in 1903 during his stay in Bilohirsk (then known as Karasubazar) as part of his Crimean Sketches symphony. Unlike most authentic pieces, Spendiaryan's Khaytarma is in 3/8 time.

In the 1930s, Ennan Alimov painted a piece about Qaytarma, titled Girl Dancing Qaytarma.

Crimean Tatar director Akhtem Seitablayev has referenced Qaytarma multiple times, most notable as the title and opening sequence of his 2013 film Haytarma. On Tantsi z zirkamy, he performed the dance alongside dancer .

Elements of Qaytarma and Tım-tım, another Crimean Tatar folk dance, were incorporated into the music video for the song 1944.

In 2015, Ukrposhta issued a stamp depicting Qaytarma as part of its Crimean Tatar stamp series.

References 

Crimean Tatar culture
Crimean Tatar music
European folk dances
Ukrainian folk dances
Ukrainian folk music